Brian Duignan (born 2000) is an Irish hurler who plays for Offaly Championship club Ballinamere and at inter-county level with the Offaly senior hurling team. He usually lines out as a forward.

Career

Son of Offaly All-Ireland-winner Michael Duignan, he first came to hurling prominence with the combined Ballinamere/Durrow club at juvenile and underage levels, while simultaneously lining out as a schoolboy with Coláiste Choilm in Tullamore. Duignan first appeared on the inter-county scene during a two-year stint with the Offaly under-20 team. He was drafted onto the Offaly senior hurling team in November 2019.

Career statistics

Honours

Offaly
Christy Ring Cup: 2021
National Hurling League Division 2A: 2021

References

2000 births
Living people
Ballinamere hurlers
Offaly inter-county hurlers